Christian August Vulpius (23 January 1762 – 25 June 1827) was a German novelist and dramatist. His sister married the noted German writer Johann Wolfgang von Goethe.

Biography
He was born at Weimar, and was educated at Jena and Erlangen. In 1790, he returned to Weimar, where Goethe obtained employment for him. Here, since 1788, Goethe had been contentedly living quasi-maritally with Vulpius's sister Christiane.

In Weimar, Vulpius began, in imitation of Christian Heinrich Spiess, to write a series of romantic narratives: operas, dramas and tales. Of these (about sixty in number), his Rinaldo Rinaldini, the Robber Captain (1797), is the most notorious.  A typical "penny dreadful" of the period, it was often translated and much imitated, but unrivaled in its bad eminence.  Its scene was laid in Italy during the Middle Ages. Vulpius was also active as an editor.

In 1797, possibly through Goethe's influence, Vulpius obtained employment at the Weimar library, of which he became chief librarian in 1806. In the latter year, Goethe also formally married Christiane. Christian died at Weimar on 25 June 1827.

Legacy
There are two filmed works based on Vulpius' most renowned penny-dread:
 Rinaldo Rinaldini (1927 film) 
  (TV series with 13 episodes produced in 1968)

Notes
 
 
Attribution:

References

External links

 
 

1762 births
1827 deaths
18th-century German novelists
19th-century German novelists
University of Jena alumni
University of Erlangen-Nuremberg alumni
Writers from Weimar
German male novelists
German male dramatists and playwrights
18th-century German dramatists and playwrights
19th-century German dramatists and playwrights
Pulp fiction writers
19th-century German male writers
18th-century German male writers